David  Schwarz (born 24 July 1972) is a former Australian rules footballer,
who retired in 2002 after playing for the Melbourne Football Club in the Australian Football League (AFL), for 12 seasons.

Football career 
Recruited from Sunbury, Schwarz made his AFL debut in 1991. As a player for the Melbourne Football Club, he was known as "the Ox" for his beast-like build. He played centre half-forward or full-forward and in 1994 kicked nine goals straight against Sydney and with some breathtaking finals performances (including "that" blind turn against Carlton). Strong marking, agile and athletic, until he suffered numerous knee injuries, playing only two games in 1995 and missing the entire 1996 season.

He capped his effort by winning the club’s best and fairest in 1999 and passing the 100 game mark – something that was unthinkable a few years earlier when knee injuries left his career in tatters. In typical style he celebrated with 20 of his closest mates and his mother, who had brought him up single handed since the age of eight. His father had been murdered.

Late in his playing career, he appeared as a panelist on the AFL Footy Show in a memorable show where Sam Newman threw a pie in his face. A visibly angry Schwarz pushed Newman down to the ground, with the latter lucky not to suffer serious injury.

He retired in the middle of 2002 having played 173 matches and kicking 244 goals.

Playing statistics

|- style="background-color: #EAEAEA"
! scope="row" style="text-align:center" | 1991
|style="text-align:center;"|
| 44 || 6 || 7 || 3 || 39 || 16 || 55 || 16 || 1 || 1.2 || 0.5 || 6.5 || 2.7 || 9.2 || 2.7 || 0.2
|-
! scope="row" style="text-align:center" | 1992
|style="text-align:center;"|
| 5 || 22 || 20 || 7 || 239 || 115 || 354 || 112 || 40 || 0.9 || 0.3 || 10.9 || 5.2 || 16.1 || 5.1 || 1.8
|- style="background:#eaeaea;"
! scope="row" style="text-align:center" | 1993
|style="text-align:center;"|
| 5 || 9 || 5 || 7 || 72 || 42 || 114 || 49 || 10 || 0.6 || 0.8 || 8.0 || 4.7 || 12.7 || 5.4 || 1.1
|-
! scope="row" style="text-align:center" | 1994
|style="text-align:center;"|
| 5 || 25 || 60 || 23 || 280 || 126 || 406 || bgcolor="DD6E81"| 173 || 34 || 2.4 || 0.9 || 11.2 || 5.0 || 16.2 || 6.9 || 1.4
|- style="background:#eaeaea;"
! scope="row" style="text-align:center" | 1995
|style="text-align:center;"|
| 5 || 2 || 3 || 1 || 5 || 5 || 10 || 4 || 0 || 1.5 || 0.5 || 2.5 || 2.5 || 5.0 || 2.0 || 0.0
|-
! scope="row" style="text-align:center" | 1996
|style="text-align:center;"|
| 5 || 0 || — || — || — || — || — || — || — || — || — || — || — || — || — || —
|- style="background:#eaeaea;"
! scope="row" style="text-align:center" | 1997
|style="text-align:center;"|
| 5 || 10 || 18 || 15 || 57 || 18 || 75 || 37 || 4 || 1.8 || 1.5 || 5.7 || 1.8 || 7.5 || 3.7 || 0.4
|-
! scope="row" style="text-align:center" | 1998
|style="text-align:center;"|
| 5 || 18 || 29 || 21 || 123 || 63 || 186 || 56 || 22 || 1.6 || 1.2 || 6.8 || 3.5 || 10.3 || 3.1 || 1.2
|-style="background:#eaeaea;"
! scope="row" style="text-align:center" | 1999
|style="text-align:center;"|
| 5 || 22 || 38 || 27 || 206 || 133 || 339 || 107 || 18 || 1.7 || 1.2 || 9.4 || 6.0 || 15.4 || 4.9 || 0.8
|-
! scope="row" style="text-align:center" | 2000
|style="text-align:center;"|
| 5 || 25 || 31 || 35 || 246 || 138 || 384 || 117 || 43 || 1.2 || 1.4 || 9.8 || 5.5 || 15.4 || 4.7 || 1.7
|-style="background:#eaeaea;"
! scope="row" style="text-align:center" | 2001
|style="text-align:center;"|
| 5 || 21 || 21 || 16 || 231 || 123 || 354 || 105 || 53 || 1.0 || 0.8 || 11.0 || 5.9 || 16.9 || 5.0 || 2.5
|-
! scope="row" style="text-align:center" | 2002
|style="text-align:center;"|
| 5 || 13 || 11 || 7 || 91 || 43 || 134 || 31 || 23 || 0.8 || 0.5 || 7.0 || 3.3 || 10.3 || 2.4 || 1.8
|- class="sortbottom"
! colspan=3| Career
! 173
! 243
! 162
! 1589
! 822
! 2411
! 807
! 248
! 1.4
! 0.9
! 9.2
! 4.8
! 13.9
! 4.7
! 1.4
|}

Media career 
Following his football career, Schwarz joined new sport radio station SEN 1116 in 2005 in Melbourne, in his time on SEN, he admitted that during his football career he had a gambling problem and whittled away most of his income. He hosted "The Run Home" on SEN from 3–7 pm weekdays with Mark Allen until 8 December 2017. axed. From 2007 to 2010 Schwarz was a part of the Channel Seven's AFL commentary team

In 2018, Schwarz joined Macquarie sports radio alongside Mark Allen to host the drive slot after their dismissals from SEN.  On 1 November 2019 the pair concluded their term at MSR as the station's entire line-up was axed. 

Since 2020 Schwarz and Allen present called The Twilight Zone on 3AW from 5-7pm on Saturdays and Sundays mainly during the AFL off-season. He also a commentator with 3AW and its Perth sister station 6PR.

References

External links 
David Schwarz's profile on the official AFL website of the Melbourne Football Club

Demon Wiki profile

Australian rules footballers from Victoria (Australia)
Melbourne Football Club players
Victorian State of Origin players
Keith 'Bluey' Truscott Trophy winners
1972 births
Australian people of German descent
Living people
People educated at Melbourne High School
People educated at St. Bernard's College, Melbourne
Radio personalities from Melbourne